The 2013 Southern Conference football season, part of the 2013 NCAA Division I FCS football season competition of college football, began on Thursday, August 29, 2013 with Chattanooga hosting Tennessee–Martin. The regular season concluded on November 23, while Samford and Furman qualified for the NCAA Division I Football Championship.

Samford was eliminated in the first round by Jacksonville State.  Furman defeated South Carolina State in the opening round, but fell to eventual champion North Dakota State 38–7 in the second round.

Appalachian State and Georgia Southern played their final seasons as members of the Southern Conference but were ineligible to win the conference championship or participate in the playoffs as they transitioned to the Football Bowl Subdivision.

Head coaches

Scott Satterfield, Appalachian State - 1st year
Russ Huesman, Chattanooga – 5th year
Kevin Higgins, The Citadel – 9th year
Jason Swepson, Elon - 3rd year
Bruce Fowler, Furman – 3rd year

Jeff Monken, Georgia Southern - 4th year
Pat Sullivan, Samford – 6th year
Mark Speir, Western Carolina – 2nd year
Mike Ayers, Wofford – 26th year

Rankings

Appalachian State and Georgia Southern were ineligible for the Coaches' Poll due to the additional scholarship players on the rosters as part of their transition to FBS.

Regular season 

All times Eastern time.

Rankings reflect that of the Sports Network poll for that week.

Week One 

Players of the week:

Week Two 

Players of the week:

Week Three 

Players of the week:

Week Four 

Players of the week:

Week Five 

Players of the week:

Records against other conferences

FCS conferences

FBS conferences

Attendance

References